James Butters Thompson (7 January 1943 – 28 October 2020) was an English professional footballer who played as a full-back.

On 28 October 2020, Thompson died after a long battle with dementia.

References

1943 births
2020 deaths
People from the Metropolitan Borough of Gateshead
Footballers from Tyne and Wear
English footballers
Association football fullbacks
St Mary's Boys Club F.C. players
Grimsby Town F.C. players
Port Elizabeth City F.C. players
Cambridge United F.C. players
English Football League players